Elisa Noëmí Cobañea (born 20 May 1966) is an Argentine long-distance runner. She competed in the women's 5000 metres at the 2000 Summer Olympics.

References

1966 births
Living people
Athletes (track and field) at the 1995 Pan American Games
Athletes (track and field) at the 2000 Summer Olympics
Argentine female long-distance runners
Olympic athletes of Argentina
Place of birth missing (living people)
Pan American Games competitors for Argentina